Store Torungen Lighthouse is a coastal lighthouse on the island of Store Torungen in the municipality of Arendal in Agder county, Norway. This lighthouse, together with the nearby Lille Torungen Lighthouse, mark the entrance from the Skaggerak through the outlying islands to the mainland town of Arendal. Both lighthouses were built in 1844 with the same specifications, making "twin" lighthouses marking the way to Arendal. The two lighthouses were put on the coat-of-arms for the local municipality of Hisøy in which the lighthouses were located. Over time, both lighthouses were replaced, and the only one still standing is the Lille Torungen Lighthouse, although it is no longer in use. The site of the Store Torungen Lighthouse is accessible only by boat. The island and site is open to the public, the tower is open daily during the summers, and the lighthouse keepers house is available to rent for overnight accommodations.

Current lighthouse
The present lighthouse was constructed in 1914 to replace an earlier tower from 1844. The round tower is made of cast iron and on top there is a light with a 2nd order Fresnel lens. The lighthouse also broadcasts a racon signal (the morse code letter "T").

History
The original lighthouse was built in 1844. The lighthouse tower was replaced in 1914 with a new tower located a short distance away from the old tower. The old tower was torn down after the new tower was completed. This upset the local residents, so they pushed to prevent its twin Lille Torungen Lighthouse from being torn down too.

Media gallery

See also
Lighthouses in Norway
List of lighthouses in Norway

References

Lighthouses in Agder
Buildings and structures in Arendal